is a city in Miyagi Prefecture, Japan. Large sections of the city were destroyed by the 2011 Tōhoku earthquake and tsunami and major fires on March 11, 2011.

Geography
Kesennuma is in the far northeastern corner of Miyagi Prefecture. The city wraps around the western part of Kesennuma Bay and also includes the island of Ōshima. Its deeply indented rias coastline forms the southern boundary of the Sanriku Fukkō National Park, which stretches north to Aomori Prefecture.

The city borders Hirota Bay, Kesennuma Bay, and the Pacific Ocean to the east and Minamisanriku, Miyagi to the south. Iwate Prefecture makes up the remainder of its borders, with the city of Ichinoseki to the west, and the city of Rikuzen-Takata to the north. The Ōkawa River flows through the city and into Kesennuma Bay.

Neighboring municipalities
Miyagi Prefecture
Tome
Minamisanriku
Iwate Prefecture
Rikuzentakada
Ichinoseki

Climate

Kesennuma has a humid climate (Köppen climate classification Cfa) characterized by mild summers and cold winters.

Demographics
Per Japanese census data, the population of Kesennuma has declined over the past 40 years.

History
The area of present-day Kesennuma was part of ancient Mutsu Province and has been settled since at least the Jōmon period by the Emishi people, as evidenced by numerous shell middens found in coastal areas. During the later portion of the Heian period, the area was ruled by the Northern Fujiwara. During the Sengoku period, the area was contested by various samurai clans before the area came under the control of the Date clan of Sendai Domain during the Edo period, under the Tokugawa shogunate. The town of Kesennuma was established on June 1, 1889 within Motoyoshi District, Miyagi with the establishment of the modern municipalities system.

Kesennuma City was formed on June 1, 1953, when the town of Kesennuma annexed the neighboring town of Shishiori and village of Matsuiwa. On April 1, 1955, the city annexed the villages of Niitsuki, Hashikami and Oshima. On March 31, 2006, the town of Karakuwa and on September 1, 2009 the town of Motoyoshi (both from Motoyoshi District) were likewise incorporated into Kesennuma.

On March 11, 2011, large parts of the city were destroyed by the tsunami which followed the Tōhoku earthquake. The island of Ōshima and its 3,000 residents, included in the city limits, was isolated by the tsunami which damaged the ferry connections.  After the tsunami, spilled fuel from the town's fishing fleet caught fire and burned for four days.  As of 22 April 2011, the city had confirmed 837 deaths with 1,196 missing.<ref>Bloomberg L.P., "Tsunami abetted fishing sector fall", The Japan Times, 26 April 2011, p. 8.</ref>

In August 2013, residents decided to scrap a fishing boat - the Kyotoku Maru No 18 - which was swept inland by a giant wave during the 2011 tsunami. There had been plans to preserve the boat as a monument, as it had become a symbol of the tsunami.

In 2014, Kesennuma was designated as Japan's first "slow town".

Government
Kesennuma has a mayor-council form of government with a directly elected mayor and a unicameral city legislature of 24 members. Kessenuma, together with Motoyoshi District contributes three seats to the Miyagi Prefectural legislature. In terms of national politics, the city is part of Miyagi 6th district of the lower house of the Diet of Japan.

Economy

Kesennuma relies on tourism and commercial fishing, the latter being what the city is known for, especially its shark, tuna, pacific saury and skipjack tuna production, keeping the fishing port very active. Prior to the 2011 disaster, the city was Japan's busiest port for processing bonito and swordfish.  Presently, fishing and associated industries account for 85% of jobs in the town.

Education
Kesennuma has 14 public elementary schools and eight junior high schools operated by the town government, and four public high schools operated by the Miyagi Prefectural Board of Education and one private high school. The prefectural government also operates one special educational school.

Transportation
Railway
 East Japan Railway Company (JR East) -  Kesennuma Line (operations suspended indefinitely and replaced by a BRT system) 
  -  -  -   -  -  -  -  -  -  -  East Japan Railway Company (JR East) -  Ōfunato Line (operations suspended indefinitely and replaced by a BRT system) 
  -  - ''

Highway

Sister/friendship cities

International 
  - Puntarenas, Costa Rica
  Zhoushan, Zhejiang Province, China
  Changyi District, Jilin,  China
  Friendship relation with Ports of Kesennuma and Seattle, Washington, United States

Japanese sister cities
  - Ichinoseki, Iwate, Japan
  - Murone, Iwate, Japan

Noted people from Kesennuma 
Satoru Kanemura, professional baseball player
Isshin Chiba, voice actor
Tetsuo Kanno, politician
Itsunori Onodera, politician
Rikako Sasaki, idol singer
Shinji Maggy, comedian and magician

References

External links

Official Website 
Eyewitness film of tsunami—caused by the 2011 Sendai earthquake—destroying Kesennuma in less than seven minutes

 
Cities in Miyagi Prefecture
Populated coastal places in Japan